Waking at Dawn is the debut commercial mixtape by Canadian recording artist Roy Woods. It was released on July 1, 2016, by OVO Sound and Warner Bros. Records. The album serves as a follow-up to his debut EP Exis (2015). It was preceded by two singles; "Gwan Big Up Urself" and "How I Feel".

Background
On March 11, 2016, Roy Woods announced the mixtape's title via Twitter. The release date and cover art was revealed on June 29, 2016.

Singles
The mixtape's lead single and second single, "Gwan Big Up Urself" and "How I Feel" was released on June 4, 2016.

Critical reception

Waking at Dawn was met with generally positive reviews. The album received a 74 out of 100 by HotNewHipHop. Writing for Exclaim!, Themistoklis Alexis praised the album's "flashes of maturity" but criticized Woods' "failure to emote fully on phonics."

Track listing
Credits were adapted from Tidal.

Personnel
Credits adapted from Tidal.

Performers
 Roy Woods – primary artist

Technical
 Sunny Diamonds – recording engineer , mixing engineer  
 Chris Athens – mastering engineer 

Production
 FrancisGotHeat – producer 
 Prezident Jeff – producer 
 Sunny Diamonds – producer 
 L.A. Chase – producer 
 Krs. – producer 
 DZL – producer 
 ALO – producer 
 Murda Beatz – producer 
 Akeel Henry – producer 
 Omari Jabari – producer 
 Saintfall – producer

Charts

Release history

References

External links
 

2016 debut albums
Roy Woods albums
Albums produced by Murda Beatz
OVO Sound albums
Warner Records albums